Rituraj Govind Jha  is an Indian politician and is member of the Sixth Legislative Assembly of Delhi. He is a member of the Aam Aadmi Party and represents Kirari (Assembly constituency) of Delhi.

Early life and education
He comes from Chakdaulat - a small village in Samastipur, Bihar. He completed his schooling from  Himalaya Public School, Karnal and Hotel Management from The Monarch International College of Hotel Management.

See also

Sixth Legislative Assembly of Delhi
Delhi Legislative Assembly
Government of India
Politics of India
Aam Aadmi Party

Electoral performance

References

External links
 Facebook Account

Delhi MLAs 2015–2020
Delhi MLAs 2020–2025
Aam Aadmi Party politicians
People from New Delhi
Living people
Year of birth missing (living people)
Aam Aadmi Party MLAs from Delhi